List of Guggenheim Fellowships awarded in 2017: Guggenheim Fellowships have been awarded annually since 1925, by the John Simon Guggenheim Memorial Foundation to those "who have demonstrated exceptional capacity for productive scholarship or exceptional creative ability in the arts."

See also
 Guggenheim Fellowship
 List of Guggenheim Fellowships awarded in 2016
 List of Guggenheim Fellowships awarded in 2018

References

2017
2017 awards
2017 art awards